N. pyramidalis  may refer to:
 Nodilittorina pyramidalis, a sea snail species
 Nucella pyramidalis, a sea snail species

See also
 Pyramidalis (disambiguation)